The 1979–80 NBA season was the Bucks' 12th season in the NBA. With 49 wins and 33 losses they won their division and ranked fourth in the Western Conference. In the 1979 NBA Draft, the Bucks drafted guard Sidney Moncrief out of the University of Arkansas. During the season, the Bucks acquired center Bob Lanier from the Detroit Pistons. After a first-round-bye the Bucks faced the defending champions, the Seattle SuperSonics, which were led by Gus Williams and Dennis Johnson. Despite being able to steal two games on the road, the Bucks lost the series in seven games. The 1979-80 season would be the Bucks last season as a Western Conference team as they switched to the Eastern Conference along with the Chicago Bulls.

Draft picks

Roster

Regular season

Season standings

z - clinched division title
y - clinched division title
x - clinched playoff spot

Record vs. opponents

Game log

|-style="background:#fcc;"
| 1 || October 12, 1979 || @ Kansas City
| L 103–105
|Marques Johnson (28)
|
|
| Municipal Auditorium
| 0–1
|-style="background:#bbffbb;"
| 2 || October 13, 1979 || @ Denver
| W 125–96
|Dave Meyers (26)
|
|
| McNichols Sports Arena
| 1–1
|-style="background:#bbffbb;"
| 3 || October 15, 1979 || @ Utah
| W 131–107
|Junior Bridgeman (28)
|
|
| Salt Palace
| 2–1
|-style="background:#bbffbb;"
| 4 || October 17, 1979 || Denver
| W 125–97
|Marques Johnson (27)
|Kent Benson (9)
|
| MECCA Arena
| 3–1
|-style="background:#bbffbb;"
| 5 || October 19, 1979 || Phoenix
| W 95–94
|Brian Winters (18)
|
|
| MECCA Arena
| 4–1
|-style="background:#bbffbb;"
| 6 || October 21, 1979 || Chicago
| W 113–111
|Junior Bridgeman (26)
|
|
| MECCA Arena
| 5–1
|-style="background:#bbffbb;"
| 7 || October 23, 1979 || @ Phoenix
| W 114–108
|
|
|
| Arizona Veterans Memorial Coliseum
| 6-1
|-style="background:#bbffbb;"
| 8 || October 25, 1979 || @ San Diego
| W 118–115
|Brian Winters (23)
|
|
| San Diego Sports Arena
| 7-1
|-style="background:#bbffbb;"
| 9 || October 27, 1979 || Detroit
| W 132–118
|
|
|
| MECCA Arena
| 8–1
|-style="background:#bbffbb;"
| 10 || October 31, 1979 || Los Angeles
| W 110–106
|
|
|
| MECCA Arena
| 9–1

|-style="background:#bbffbb;"
| 11 || November 3, 1979 || @ Chicago
| W 136–134 (OT)
|
|
|
| Chicago Stadium
| 10–1
|-style="background:#fcc;"
| 12 || November 4, 1979 || Seattle
| L 101–114
|
|
|
| MECCA Arena
| 10–2
|-style="background:#fcc;"
| 13 || November 6, 1979 || Philadelphia
| L 117–118
|
|
|
| MECCA Arena
| 10–3
|-style="background:#bbffbb;"
| 14 || November 8, 1979 || Portland
| W 98–89
|
|
|
| MECCA Arena
| 11–3
|-style="background:#bbffbb;"
| 15 || November 10, 1979 || San Diego
| W 133–104
|
|
|
| MECCA Arena
| 12–3
|-style="background:#bbffbb;"
| 16 || November 13, 1979 || @ Portland
| W 101–92
|
|
|
| Memorial Coliseum
| 13–3
|-style="background:#fcc;"
| 17 || November 14, 1979 || @ Seattle
| L 117–136
|
|
|
| Kingdome
| 13–4
|-style="background:#fcc;"
| 18 || November 18, 1979 || @ San Diego
| L 96–112
|
|
|
| San Diego Sports Arena
| 13–5
|-style="background:#bbffbb;"
| 19 || November 21, 1979 || Atlanta
| W 96–93
|
|
|
| MECCA Arena
| 14–5
|-style="background:#bbffbb;"
| 20 || November 22, 1979 || @ New Jersey
| W 117–109
|
|
|
| Rutgers Athletic Center
| 15–5
|-style="background:#fcc;"
| 21 || November 23, 1979 || @ Detroit
| L 100–119
|
|
|
| Pontiac Silverdome
| 15–6
|-style="background:#bbffbb;"
| 22 || November 25, 1979 || Golden State
| W 114–90
|
|
|
| MECCA Arena
| 16–6
|-style="background:#fcc;"
| 23 || November 27, 1979 || New Jersey
| L 93–118
|
|
|
| MECCA Arena
| 16–7
|-style="background:#bbffbb;"
| 24 || November 28, 1979 || @ Indiana
| W 87–79
|
|
|
| Market Square Arena
| 17–7

|-style="background:#bbffbb;"
| 25 || December 1, 1979 || @ Golden State
| W 109–99
|
|
|
| Oakland-Alameda County Coliseum Arena
| 18–7
|-style="background:#fcc;"
| 26 || December 2, 1979 || @ Los Angeles
| L 103–116
|
|
|
| The Forum
| 18–8
|-style="background:#bbffbb;"
| 27 || December 3, 1979 || @ Utah
| W 96–89
|
|
|
| Salt Palace
| 19–8
|-style="background:#fcc;"
| 28 || December 5, 1979 || @ Denver
| L 107–123
|
|
|
| McNichols Sports Arena
| 19–9
|-style="background:#fcc;"
| 29 || December 7, 1979 || San Antonio
| L 105–117
|
|
|
| MECCA Arena
| 19–10
|-style="background:#fcc;"
| 30 || December 9, 1979 || Boston
| L 108–113
|
|
|
| MECCA Arena
| 19–11
|-style="background:#fcc;"
| 31 || December 11, 1979 || Seattle
| L 99–103
|
|
|
| MECCA Arena
| 19–12
|-style="background:#fcc;"
| 33 || December 12, 1979 || @ Philadelphia
| L 91–112
|
|
|
| The Spectrum
| 19–13
|-style="background:#fcc;"
| 33 || December 14, 1979 || @ Boston
| L 94–97
|
|
|
| Boston Garden
| 19–14
|-style="background:#bbffbb;"
| 34 || December 16, 1979 || Utah
| W 104–79
|
|
|
| MECCA Arena
| 20–14
|-style="background:#bbffbb;"
| 35 || December 20, 1979 || Kansas City
| W 120–109
|
|
|
| MECCA Arena
| 21–14
|-style="background:#fcc;"
| 36 || December 23, 1979 || @ Phoenix
| L 103–106
|
|
|
| Arizona Veterans Memorial Coliseum
| 21–15
|-style="background:#bbffbb;"
| 37 || December 26, 1979 || Chicago
| W 110–101
|
|
|
| MECCA Arena
| 22–15
|-style="background:#fcc;"
| 38 || December 27, 1979 || @ Washington
| L 108–117
|
|
|
| Capital Centre
| 22–16
|-style="background:#fcc;"
| 39 || December 29, 1979 || @ New York
| L 105–117
|
|
|
| Madison Square Garden
| 22–17
|-style="background:#fcc;"
| 40 || December 30, 1979 || Utah
| L 88–95
|
|
|
| MECCA Arena
| 22–18

|-style="background:#bbffbb;"
| 41 || January 3, 1980 || Indiana
| W 106–96
|
|
|
| MECCA Arena
| 23–18
|-style="background:#bbffbb;"
| 42 || January 5, 1980 || @ Cleveland
| W 99–98
|
|
|
| Richfield Coliseum
| 24–18
|-style="background:#bbffbb;"
| 43 || January 6, 1980 || Los Angeles
| W 113–103
|
|
|
| MECCA Arena
| 25–18
|-style="background:#fcc;"
| 44 || January 8, 1980 || @ Chicago
| L 102–110
|
|
|
| Chicago Stadium
| 25–19
|-style="background:#bbffbb;"
| 46 || January 11, 1980 || New York
| W 109–107
|
|
|
| MECCA Arena
| 26–20
|-style="background:#fcc;"
| 47 || January 13, 1980 || Houston
| L 117–121
|
|
|
| MECCA Arena
| 26–21
|-style="background:#fcc;"
| 48 || January 16, 1980 || Kansas City
| L 108–112
|
|
|
| MECCA Arena
| 26–22
|-style="background:#bbffbb;"
| 50 || January 20, 1980 || Portland
| W 89–88
|
|
|
| MECCA Arena
| 27–23
|-style="background:#fcc;"
| 53 || January 25, 1980 || @ Phoenix
| L 96–110
|
|
|
| Arizona Veterans Memorial Coliseum
| 28–25
|-style="background:#fcc;"
| 54 || January 27, 1980 || @ Los Angeles
| L 102–112
|
|
|
| The Forum
| 28–26
|-style="background:#bbffbb;"
| 55 || January 29, 1980 || @ Portland
| W 103–96
|
|
|
| Memorial Coliseum
| 29–26
|-style="background:#fcc;"
| 56 || January 31, 1980 || @ Seattle
| L 101–105
|
|
|
| Kingdome
| 29–27

|-style="background:#bbffbb;"
| 57 || February 6, 1980 || Cleveland
| W 111–109
|
|
|
| MECCA Arena
| 30–27
|-style="background:#bbffbb;"
| 58 || February 8, 1980 || Washington
| W 115–90
|
|
|
| MECCA Arena
| 31–27
|-style="background:#bbffbb;"
| 59 || February 10, 1980 || Phoenix
| W 109–107
|Bob Lanier (23)
|
|
| MECCA Arena
| 32–27
|-style="background:#bbffbb;"
| 60 || February 13, 1980 || Chicago
| W 111–101
|Junior Bridgeman (32)
|
|
| MECCA Arena
| 33–27
|-style="background:#bbffbb;"
| 62 || February 15, 1980 || @ Houston
| W 114–103
|
|
|
| The Summit
| 35–27
|-style="background:#fcc;"
| 63 || February 17, 1980 || @ San Antonio
| L 134–135
|
|
|
| HemisFair Arena
| 35–28
|-style="background:#fcc;"
| 64 || February 20, 1980 || @ Atlanta
| L 103–106
|
|
|
| The Omni
| 35–29
|-style="background:#bbffbb;"
| 65 || February 24, 1980 || @ Kansas City
| W 94–72
|
|
|
| Kemper Arena
| 36–29
|-style="background:#bbffbb;"
| 66 || February 26, 1980 || San Diego
| W 122–88
|Pat Cummings (25)
|Harvey Catchings (11)
|Junior Bridgeman, Quinn Buckner (7)
| MECCA Arena
| 37–29
|-style="background:#bbffbb;"
| 67 || February 27, 1980 || @ Phoenix
| W 119–110 (OT)
|
|
|
| Arizona Veterans Memorial Coliseum
| 38-29
|-style="background:#bbffbb;"
| 68 || February 29, 1980 || @ Los Angeles
| W 126–117
|Brian Winters (34)
|
|
| The Forum
| 36—29

|-style="background:#bbffbb;"
| 70 || March 4, 1980 || Los Angeles
| L 124–127
|
|
|
| MECCA Arena
| 40–30
|-style="background:#bbffbb;"
| 73 || March 12, 1980 || Seattle
| W 112–103
|
|
|
| MECCA Arena
| 42–31
|-style="background:#bbffbb;"
| 74 || March 14, 1980 || Portland
| W 120–110
|
|
|
| MECCA Arena
| 43–31
|-style="background:#bbffbb;"
| 75 || March 16, 1980 || Kansas City
| W 128–121
|
|
|
| MECCA Arena
| 44–31
|-style="background:#fcc;"
| 76 || March 18, 1980 || @ Portland
| L 122–123
|
|
|
| Memorial Coliseum
| 44–32
|-style="background:#bbffbb;"
| 77 || March 19, 1980 || @ Seattle
| W 108–106
|
|
|
| Kingdome
| 45–32
|-style="background:#bbffbb;"
| 78 || March 21, 1980 || Golden State
| W 121–93
|
|
|
| MECCA Arena
| 46–32
|-style="background:#bbffbb;"
| 79 || March 25, 1980 || @ Chicago
| W 122–111
|
|
|
| Chicago Stadium
| 47–32
|-style="background:#fcc;"
| 81 || March 28, 1980 || @ Kansas City
| L 114–116
|
|
|
| Kemper Arena
| 48–33

Playoffs

|- align="center" bgcolor="#ffcccc"
| 1
| April 8
| @ Seattle
| L 113–114 (OT)
| Bob Lanier (27)
| Bob Lanier (10)
| Quinn Buckner (8)
| Seattle Center Coliseum13,648
| 0–1
|- align="center" bgcolor="#ccffcc"
| 2
| April 9
| @ Seattle
| W 114–112 (OT)
| Brian Winters (28)
| Bob Lanier (8)
| Brian Winters (5)
| Seattle Center Coliseum14,050
| 1–1
|- align="center" bgcolor="#ccffcc"
| 3
| April 11
| Seattle
| W 95–91
| Bob Lanier (24)
| Marques Johnson (10)
| Quinn Buckner (7)
| MECCA Arena10,938
| 2–1
|- align="center" bgcolor="#ffcccc"
| 4
| April 13
| Seattle
| L 107–112
| Marques Johnson (31)
| Lanier, Meyers (9)
| Junior Bridgeman (8)
| MECCA Arena10,938
| 2–2
|- align="center" bgcolor="#ccffcc"
| 5
| April 15
| @ Seattle
| W 108–97
| Bob Lanier (22)
| Marques Johnson (8)
| Bob Lanier (6)
| Kingdome40,172
| 3–2
|- align="center" bgcolor="#ffcccc"
| 6
| April 18
| Seattle
| L 85–86
| Marques Johnson (22)
| Bob Lanier (12)
| Brian Winters (7)
| MECCA Arena10,938
| 3–3
|- align="center" bgcolor="#ffcccc"
| 7
| April 20
| @ Seattle
| L 94–98
| Marques Johnson (22)
| Bob Lanier (15)
| Quinn Buckner (7)
| Seattle Center Coliseum14,050
| 3–4
|-

Player statistics

Season

Playoffs

Awards and records
Marques Johnson, All-NBA Second Team
Quinn Buckner, NBA All-Defensive Second Team

Transactions

Trades

See also
1979–80 NBA season

References

Milwaukee Bucks seasons
M
1979 in sports in Wisconsin
Milwaukee Bucks